WIHS (104.9 FM) is a radio station broadcasting a Christian radio format. Licensed to Middletown, Connecticut, United States, the station serves the Hartford area.  The station is owned by Connecticut Radio Fellowship, Inc. and features programming from Salem Communications.

WIHS is a ministry of the Connecticut Radio Fellowship, broadcasting music, local and national Christian programs. WIHS is non-commercial, 100% listener supported, and has been broadcasting Christian programs since 1969.

The call sign WIHS-TV was used from 1964 to 1966 by the Archdiocese of Boston on UHF Channel 38; that station is now WSBK-TV.

References

External links

Middletown, Connecticut
Middlesex County, Connecticut
Moody Radio affiliate stations
Radio stations established in 1969
1969 establishments in Connecticut
IHS